Kerry Lang (born 24 January 1976, in Glasgow, Scotland) is a British professional triathlete, Scottish Duathlon Champion and British Triathlon Vice Champion of the year 2009, and Scottish Road Race (Bike) Champion of the years 2007 and 2008. She has represented Great Britain in the World Championship Series since 2009 and she represented Great Britain in the Series' precursor, the BG World Cup, in 2007 and 2008.

Sports career 
Kerry Lang started her ITU career in 2004, when she won her first European Cup medal.
In the seven years from 2004 to 2010, Lang took part in 39 ITU competitions and achieved 8 top ten positions.
In the World Championship Series Ranking2011, Lang fell back to the 63rd position (August 2011) because she did not finish two races.

Kerry Lang also takes part in non ITU events, in 2011, for instance, she won the 15th International Lanzarote Duathlon (22 January 2011).

In France, Lang has represented the club Poissy at the prestigious Club Championship Series Lyonnaise des Eaux since 2008. In 2010, she placed 12th and 14th in Beauvais and Paris respectively. In 2011, she took part in the Grand Prix triathlon at Tours (28 August 2011), for this race, however, there is no individual ranking.

Kerry Lang holds a degree from the University of Edinburgh Medical School (MBChB, 1998) and from the Royal College of Surgeons (MRCS, Glasgow 2001).
She works in the ear, nose and throat department of Glasgow's Southern General Hospital.
Kerry Lang lives in Elderslie. Her coach is Marc Jenkins, the husband of the Welsh triathlete Helen Jenkins.

ITU Competitions 
The following list is based upon the official ITU rankings and the ITU Athletes's Profile Page.
Unless indicated otherwise, the following events are triathlons (Olympic Distance) and refer to the Elite category.

DNF = did not finish · DNS = did not start · BG = the sponsor British Gas

External links 
 Lang's Official Website
 Profile Page (British Triathlon Federation)

Notes 

Scottish female triathletes
British female triathletes
1976 births
Sportspeople from Glasgow
Living people
Alumni of the University of Edinburgh